Brian Balmages (born January 24, 1975) is an American composer, conductor, and music educator. He primarily composes wind ensemble works.

Early life and education 

Brian Balmages was born in Baltimore. His father was a trumpet player and his mother was an opera singer. Brian Balmages obtained a B.M. in Music Industry from James Madison University, with a focus on trumpet performance, and an M.M. in Media Scoring and Production from the Frost School of Music at the University of Miami.

Career 

Initially, Balmages played trumpet in a Miami orchestra. Later, he concentrated on composition, teaching, music publishing, and on conducting nationwide. Internationally, Balmages has conducted in Canada, Italy, and Australia. He is the assistant director of bands and orchestras at Towson University and the director of instrumental publications at the FJH Music Company.

Works

For wind instruments 

 Pele for Solo horn and Wind Ensemble (2004)
 Moscow 1941 for Concert Band (2006)
 Apollo for Soprano Saxophone and Wind Ensemble (2008)
 Summer Resounding! for Concert Band (2008)
 Three Celtic Dances for Concert Band (2008)
 Arabian Dances for Symphonic Band (2009)
 Elements for Concert Band (2010)
 Incantation and Ritual for Wind Orchestra (2015)
 Rippling Watercolors for Concert Band (2015)
Kyiv, a Sequel to Moscow, 1941 (2022)

 Into the Arctic
 Sapier's Story
 Midnight Mission
 Endless Rainbows
 Fanfare Canzonique

For string instruments 
 Backstage Pass for Symphony Orchestra, Concert band, or Jazz band (2015)
 It Takes One to Tango for Cello and Orchestra

Personal 
Balmages resides in Lutherville, Maryland. He is married and has two children.

References

External links
Musician website
An interview with Balmages

1975 births
Living people
American trumpeters
American conductors (music)
Musicians from Baltimore
James Madison University alumni
University of Miami Frost School of Music alumni
People from Lutherville, Maryland
American music educators
21st-century American composers
20th-century American composers
Towson University faculty